NCLS may refer to:

 National Church Life Survey, Australia
 Neuronal Ceroid Lipofuscinoses (NCLs), a group of neurodegenerative lysosomal storage disorders
 Newton County Library System, Newton County, Georgia, U.S.

See also

 
 
 NCL (disambiguation)
 NLCS (disambiguation)